The 1941 Nova Scotia general election was held on 28 October 1941 to elect members of the 42nd House of Assembly of the Province of Nova Scotia, Canada. It was won by the Liberal party.

Results

Results by party

* The CCF ran in the 1933 election but did not run any candidates in 1937. The party elected 1 MLA in the 1939 Cape Breton East by-election.

Retiring incumbents
Liberal
Henry R. L. Bill, Shelburne
George Belcher Murray, Cape Breton North

Nominated candidates
Legend
bold denotes party leader
† denotes an incumbent who is not running for re-election or was defeated in nomination contest

Valley

|-
|bgcolor=whitesmoke|Annapolis
||
|John D. McKenzie4,29260.60%
|
|Hanson Taylor Dowell2,79039.40%
|
|
||
|John D. McKenzie
|-
|bgcolor=whitesmoke|Digby
||
|Joseph William Comeau4,81862.34%
|
|James John Wallis2,91037.66%
|
|
||
|Joseph William Comeau
|-
|bgcolor=whitesmoke|Hants
||
|Alexander Stirling MacMillan4,87157.56%
|
|Norman Dexter Blanchard3,59242.44%
|
|
||
|Alexander Stirling MacMillan
|-
|bgcolor=whitesmoke|Kings
||
|John Alexander McDonald6,65462.58%
|
|Raymond Crosby3,97837.42%
|
|
||
|John Alexander McDonald
|}

South Shore

|-
|rowspan=2 bgcolor=whitesmoke|Lunenburg
||
|Frank R. Davis6,36629.39%
|
|R. Clifford Levy4,60121.24%
|
|
||
|Frank R. Davis
|-
||
|Gordon E. Romkey6,28829.03%
|
|Angus J. Walters4,40420.33%
|
|
||
|Gordon E. Romkey
|-
|bgcolor=whitesmoke|Queens
||
|Harry Dennis Madden2,46150.13%
|
|John J. Cameron2,44849.87%
|
|
||
|John J. Cameron
|-
|bgcolor=whitesmoke|Shelburne
||
|Wilfred Dauphinee2,42250.73%
|
|Frederick William Bower2,35249.27%
|
|
||
|Henry R. L. Bill†
|-
|bgcolor=whitesmoke|Yarmouth 
||
|Henry A. Waterman4,55163.02%
|
|Peter Lorimer Judge2,67036.98%
|
|
||
|Henry A. Waterman
|}

Fundy-Northeast

|-
|rowspan=2 bgcolor=whitesmoke|Colchester
|
|Alexander Murdoch Sutherland5,16023.74%
||
|Frederick Murray Blois5,84226.88%
|
|
||
|Frederick Murray Blois
|-
|
|Robert F. McLellan5,30124.39%
||
|George Scott Dickey5,43224.99%
|
|
||
|George Scott Dickey
|-
|rowspan=2 bgcolor=whitesmoke|Cumberland
|
|Archibald J. Mason7,04022.87%
||
|Archie B. Smith7,95425.84%
|
|
||
|Archie B. Smith
|-
||
|Kenneth Judson Cochrane7,97025.90%
|
|Leonard William Fraser7,81425.39%
|
|
||
|Leonard William Fraser
|}

Halifax/Dartmouth/Eastern Shore

|-
|bgcolor=whitesmoke|Halifax Centre
||
|James Edward Rutledge4,22659.49%
|
|Arthur Wilfred Morton2,87840.51%
|
|
||
|James Edward Rutledge
|-
|bgcolor=whitesmoke|Halifax East
||
|Geoffrey W. Stevens5,09460.39%
|
|Norman Dudley Murray3,34139.61%
|
|
||
|Geoffrey W. Stevens
|-
|bgcolor=whitesmoke|Halifax North
||
|Harold Connolly4,12464.98%
|
|Helen Macdonald Lownds1,96230.91%
|
|James Ronald Clark2614.11%
||
|Harold Connolly
|-
|bgcolor=whitesmoke|Halifax South
||
|Joseph Richard Murphy4,38158.75%
|
|Arthur James Haliburton3,07641.25%
|
|
||
|Joseph Richard Murphy
|-
|bgcolor=whitesmoke|Halifax West
||
|Ronald Manning Fielding4,45958.37%
|
|John Shenstone Roper3,18041.63%
|
|
||
|Vacant
|}

Central Nova

|-
|bgcolor=whitesmoke|Antigonish 
||
|John A. MacIsaac2,75961.49%
|
|Michael Ignatius Webb1,72838.51%
|
|
||
|Vacant
|-
|bgcolor=whitesmoke|Guysborough
||
|Havelock Torrey3,75964.15%
|
|John Donald McIntyre2,10135.85%
|
|
||
|Havelock Torrey
|-
|rowspan=2 bgcolor=whitesmoke|Pictou
|
|Newton G. Munro7,56223.16%
||
|Ernest G. Irish8,25625.28%
|
|
||
|Newton G. Munro
|-
||
|Josiah H. MacQuarrie8,78026.89%
|
|W. Thomas Hayden8,05524.67%
|
|
||
|Josiah H. MacQuarrie
|}

Cape Breton

|-
|bgcolor=whitesmoke|Cape Breton Centre
|
|Gus Brown2,27530.96%
|
|John Clifford Gregor1,15515.72%
||
|Douglas MacDonald3,91853.32%
||
|Douglas MacDonald
|-
|bgcolor=whitesmoke|Cape Breton East
|
|Lauchlin Daniel Currie4,05239.44%
|
|
||
|Douglas Neil Brodie6,22260.56%
||
|Lauchlin Daniel Currie
|-
|bgcolor=whitesmoke|Cape Breton North
||
|Alexander O'Handley3,34439.97%
|
|Joseph Angus MacDougall2,38728.53%
|
|Robert Silas Bartlett2,63631.50%
||
|George Belcher Murray†
|-
|bgcolor=whitesmoke|Cape Breton South
|
|George M. Morrison3,94635.96%
|
|Donald John MacLean3,01927.51%
||
|Donald MacDonald4,00836.53%
||
|George M. Morrison
|-
|bgcolor=whitesmoke|Cape Breton West
||
|Malcolm A. Patterson2,30641.10%
|
|John Alexander MacDonald1,76731.49%
|
|Robert Joseph Orr1,53827.41%
||
|Malcolm A. Patterson
|-
|bgcolor=whitesmoke|Inverness
||
|Alexander H. McKinnon5,30263.54%
|
|Alexander Daniel McInnis3,04336.46%
|
|
||
|Alexander H. McKinnon
|-
|bgcolor=whitesmoke|Richmond
||
|Donald David Boyd2,17650.59%
|
|Benjamin Amedeé LeBlanc2,12549.41%
|
|
||
|Donald David Boyd
|-
|bgcolor=whitesmoke|Victoria
||
|John Malcolm Campbell2,17663.05%
|
|John Roderick Fraser1,27536.95%
|
|
||
|John Malcolm Campbell
|}

References

 

1941
1941 elections in Canada
1941 in Nova Scotia
October 1941 events